Kathleen Faith Pepito Arado (born May 22, 1998) is a Filipino volleyball athlete. She was a member of the UE Lady Warriors in the UAAP. She was named the UAAP Season 77 Rookie of the Year alongside Ennajie Laure. She also bagged the Best Libero award in the 2016 South East Asian Junior Women's Volleyball Championships in Sisaket, Thailand.

Career
Arado is a member of the Under-19 Philippines women's national volleyball team in 2016 which competed in the 2016 Asian Women's U19 Volleyball Championship. The team finished at 10th place defeating Australia, Hong Kong, Macau, and New Zealand. She was also the libero of the team which competed in the 2016 South East Asian Junior Women's Volleyball Championships where the team finished at the fourth place. She was awarded as the 2016 South East Asian Junior Women's Volleyball Championships Best Libero. Arado joined the UE Lady Warriors to play in the UAAP where she was awarded as the UAAP Season 77 Rookie of the Year, UAAP Season 79 Best Digger, and UAAP Season 80 Best Digger and Best Receiver. She joined the Generika-Ayala Lifesavers in their journey in the Philippine Super Liga.  In 2021, she signed to Petro Gazz Angels, making her debut at the Premier Volleyball League.

Awards

Individual
 UAAP Season 77 "Rookie of the Year"
 2016 ASEAN Junior Championship "Best Libero"
 UAAP Season 79 "Best Digger"
 UAAP Season 80 "Best Receiver"
 UAAP Season 80 "Best Digger"
 2018 PSL Collegiate Grand Slam Conference "Best Libero"
 2018 PSL All-Filipino Conference "Best Libero"
 UAAP Season 81 "Best Libero"'
 2021 Premier Volleyball League Open Conference "Best Libero"''

Collegiate
 2018 PSL Collegiate Grand Slam Conference –  Bronze medal, with University of the East Lady Warriors

Clubs
 2018 PSL All-Filipino Conference –  third place, with Generika-Ayala Lifesavers
 2021 Premier Volleyball League Open Conference –  third place, with Petro Gazz Angels

References

living people
1998 births
University Athletic Association of the Philippines volleyball players
University of the East alumni
Women's beach volleyball players
Philippines women's international volleyball players
Filipino women's volleyball players
Liberos
Sportspeople from Lanao del Norte
People from Iligan
Competitors at the 2019 Southeast Asian Games
Competitors at the 2021 Southeast Asian Games
Southeast Asian Games competitors for the Philippines
21st-century Filipino women